The Salt Lake meridian, established in 1855, in longitude 111° 54′ 00″ west from Greenwich, has its initial point at southeast corner of Temple Square, in Salt Lake City, Utah, extends north and south through the state, and, with the base line, through the initial, and coincident with the parallel of 40° 46′ 04″ north latitude, governs the surveys in the territory, except those referred to the Uintah meridian and Baseline projected from an initial point in latitude 40° 26′ 20″ north, longitude 109° 57′ 30″ west from Greenwich.

See also
List of principal and guide meridians and base lines of the United States
Mormon settlement techniques of the Salt Lake Valley

References

External links

Surveying of the United States
Meridians and base lines of the United States
Named meridians
Geography of Utah
Historic American Engineering Record in Utah
1855 establishments in Utah Territory